Ivars is a Latvian masculine given name, derived from Scandinavian Ivar. It also occurs as a surname in some cases.

Given name
Ivars Godmanis (born 1951), Latvian politician
Ivars Hirss (1931–1989), Latvian-born American painter
Ivars Kalniņš (born 1948), Latvian actor
Ivars Knēts (born 1938), Latvian materials scientist
Ivars Peterson (born 1948), Canadian mathematics writer
Ivars Timermanis (born 1982), Latvian basketball player

Surname
Ann-Marie Ivars, Swedish Finnish linguist
Peter Ivars, Finnish orienteer

See also
Aivars

Norwegian-language surnames
Latvian masculine given names